Casama is a genus of tussock moths in the family Erebidae.

Species
The following species are included in the genus.
Casama brauni Adeoud, 1935
Casama griseola Rothschild, 1921
Casama hemippa Swinhoe, 1906
Casama impura Hering, 1926
Casama indeterminata Walker, 1865
Casama intermissa Hering, 1926
Casama leporina Zerny, 1935
Casama promissa Hering, 1926
Casama richteri Daniel, 1960
Casama vilis Walker, 1865

References

Natural History Museum Lepidoptera genus database

Lymantriinae
Moth genera